Brokoff may refer to:

Jan Brokoff (1652–1718), baroque sculptor
Michael Brokoff (1686–1721), baroque sculptor, son of Jan Brokoff
Ferdinand Brokoff (1688–1731), baroque sculptor, son of Jan Brokoff
6769 Brokoff, an asteroid